"All I Want (For Christmas)" is a song by British singer Liam Payne. It was released as a single on 25 October 2019 by Capitol Records as a bonus track off Payne's debut studio album LP1.

Music video
A music video to accompany the release of "All I Want (For Christmas)" was first released onto YouTube on 29 November 2019.

Charts

Release history

References

2010s ballads
2019 songs
2019 singles
British Christmas songs
Liam Payne songs
Pop ballads
Songs written by James Newman (musician)
Songs written by Preston (singer)
Songs written by Phil Cook (musician)